Marcel van Hattem (born 8 November 1985) is a political scientist, journalist, international relations consultant and Brazilian politician. He currently serves in Brazil's Chamber of Deputies and is known for his conservative views.

References 

|-

1985 births
Living people
People from Rio Grande do Sul
Brazilian people of Dutch descent
Brazilian people of German descent
Progressistas politicians
New Party (Brazil) politicians
Members of the Legislative Assembly of Rio Grande do Sul
Federal University of Rio Grande do Sul alumni
Leiden University alumni
Aarhus University alumni